"Red Flag" is the tenth episode of season one of the CBS drama Jericho.

Plot
On the eve of Thanksgiving, Jake, Stanley and an unidentified man are hunting for turkeys.

A Chinese aircraft airdrops several parcels.

Finding one such parcel in a field, they open it to discover that it is stocked with food.

Stanley arrives home to discover not only that Mimi has already helped herself to some chocolate from a food parcel but also that another airdropped container contains a generator. He sends Mimi off to tell Jake.

Mayor Green, Jake and Hawkins organize a raid on Jonah's compound to retrieve the generator. However, before they can do anything, Emily, who had sneaked in minutes before, drives the truck carrying the generator out the front gate to the astonishment of Jake and Jonah, who orders his men not to fire. Afterward, some of Jonah's men, especially Mitchell, question his decision. Jonah tells them that you win some and you lose some and dares Mitchell to challenge his leadership directly, which leads Mitchell to back down for now.

Elsewhere, the relationship between Stanley and Mimi grows closer when she helps him recover from his wounds, and they later kiss after he helps her remember Thanksgiving before the bombs by mixing her a Tang and tequila drink. Eric finally learns that April is pregnant.

Hawkins returns home late for Thanksgiving dinner to face his disappointed family, who had hoped that at least this year he would be there instead of away on an assignment. Hawkins asks his family to accompany him to the center of town to see what he was working on. At the end of the episode, Hawkins helps Jimmy turn on the generator. People gather in the streets to see the lights illuminate for the first time since the EMP. As Gracie closes up shop, an unknown person grabs her from behind and stabs her in the abdomen with a knife. She slumps to the floor as people continue to walk by outside, unaware of her predicament.

Music
 Five for Fighting - "World"

References

External links
"Red Flag" at CBS.com

2006 American television episodes
Jericho (2006 TV series) episodes